Palmyra (Palmyrene:  Tadmor) is a city in central Syria, administratively part of the Homs Governorate. Relatively isolated, the nearest localities include Arak to the east, Al-Sukhnah further to the northeast, Tiyas to the west and al-Qaryatayn to the southwest.

Palmyra is the administrative centre of the Tadmur District and the Tadmur Subdistrict. According to the Syria Central Bureau of Statistics (CBS), the city had a population of 51,323 and the subdistrict a population of 55,062 in the 2004 census. Tadmur's inhabitants were recorded to be predominantly Sunni Muslims in 1838. It has a small Christian community. The city has a Syriac Catholic Church, which is the only church in the city. During the Syrian Civil War, the city's population significantly increased due to the influx of internally displaced refugees from other parts of the country.

Name
In Arabic, both cities are known as 'Tadmur'. Tadmur is the Semitic and earliest attested native name of the city; it appeared in the first half of the second millennium BC. The etymology of "Tadmur" is vague; Albert Schultens considered it to be derived from the Semitic word for dates ("Tamar"), in reference to the palm trees that surround the city. 13th century Syrian geographer Yaqut al-Hamawi states Tadmur was the name of the daughter of one of Noah's distant descendants and that she was buried in the city.

In English and other European languages, the ancient and modern cities are commonly known as "Palmyra". The name "Palmyra" appeared during the early first century AD, in the works of Pliny the Elder, and was used throughout the Greco-Roman world. The general view holds that "Palmyra" is derived from "Tadmur" either as an alteration, which was supported by Schultens, or as a translation using the Greek word for palm ("palame", παλάμη), which is supported by Jean Starcky. Michael Patrick O'Connor argued for a Hurrian origin of both "Palmyra" and "Tadmur", citing the incapability of explaining the alterations to the theorized roots of both names, which are represented in the adding of a -d- to "Tamar" and a -ra- to "palame". According to this theory, "Tadmur" is derived from the Hurrian word "tad", meaning "to love", + a typical Hurrian mid vowel rising (mVr) formant "mar". "Palmyra" is derived from the word "pal", meaning "to know", + the same mVr formant "mar".

There is a Syriac etymology for Tadmor, referring to dmr "to wonder", and Tedmurtā (Aramaic: ܬܕܡܘܪܬܐ) "Miracle"; thus Tadmūra means "object of wonder", most recently affirmed by Franz Altheim and Ruth Altheim-Stiehl (1973), but rejected by Jean Starcky (1960) and Michał Gawlikowski (1974).

History

In 1929, Henri Arnold Seyrig, the general director of antiquities in the French Mandate for Syria and the Lebanon, started excavating the ruins of Palmyra and forcibly displaced the villagers to a government-built village, adjacent to the ancient site. The relocation was completed in 1932, making the ancient city of Palmyra ready for excavations, while the residents settled in the new village of the same name.

On 13 May 2015, the militant organization Islamic State of Iraq and the Levant (ISIL) launched an attack on the modern town, raising fears that the iconoclastic group would destroy the historic city. On 18 May ISIL captured the city, with their forces entering the area of the World Heritage Site several days later.

In May 2015 ISIL destroyed the tomb of Mohammed bin Ali, a descendant of the Islamic prophet Muhammad's cousin Ali, and a site revered by Shia Muslims, and sometime between then and 23 June destroyed the tomb of Nizar Abu Bahaaeddine, a Sufi scholar who lived in Palmyra in the 16th century. Ten days prior to the tombs' destruction, ISIL destroyed a number of tombstones at a local cemetery for Palmyra's residents. ISIL is also reported to have placed explosives around Palmyra.

In March 2016 a large-scale offensive by the SAA (supported by Hezbollah and Russian airstrikes) initially regained the areas south and west of the city. After capturing the orchards and the area north of the city, the assault on the city began. In the early morning hours of the 27th of March 2016, the Syrian military forces regained full control over the city. In December 2016, ISIS retook the oilfields outside of the city, and began moving back into the city center.

On 1 March 2017, the Syrian army backed by warplanes, had entered to Palmyra and captured the western and northern western sections of the city amid information about pulling back by ISIS from the city. The next day, the Syrian Army recaptured the entire city of Palmyra, after ISIL fully withdrew from the city.

On 19 April 2021, the Russian Defence Ministry announced that it had killed "up to 200 fighters", by targeting a "terrorist" base northeast of Palmyra.

Economy
Palmyra is a modern resettlement of the ancient city of Palmyra, which developed adjacently to the north of the ancient ruins. The modern city is built along a grid pattern. Quwatli Street is the main road and runs east-west, starting from the Saahat al-Ra'is Square on the western edge of the town. The city served as a base for tourists visiting the ruins. It has a museum in the southwestern part of the city. Syria holds an annual cultural festival in Tadmur celebrating the city's ancient heritage. The Palmyra Airport is located here. The city is also home to the Tadmur Prison, which has historically held numerous opponents of the various Syrian governments.

Palmyra also serves as a center for Syria's phosphate mining and natural gas industries. The first phosphate mine run by the government was established near Tadmur and started production in 1971. Work to connect Tadmur's phosphate mines to the port of Tartus began in 1978. In 1986 Soviet surveyors discovered large iron ore deposits in the vicinity of Tadmur.

Climate

Notes

References

Bibliography

 
  
 

Populated places in Tadmur District
Cities in Syria